Mamadyshsky (masculine), Mamadyshskaya (feminine), or Mamadyshkoye (neuter) may refer to:
Mamadyshsky District, a district of the Republic of Tatarstan, Russia
sovkhoza "Mamadyshsky", a rural locality (a settlement) in the Republic of Tatarstan, Russia
fermy No. 2 sovkhoza "Mamadyshsky", a rural locality (a settlement) in the Republic of Tatarstan, Russia